Jonestown is an unincorporated community in Howard County, Maryland, United States.

The Jonestown area was a historic African American community near Ellicott City that was centered on the crossroads where Howard High School is presently located. The town's identity has been mostly absorbed into Ellicott City and Columbia's Long Reach village.

History
Jonestown appeared on Martenet's 1860 map of Howard County, George Kaiser's 1863 map of Baltimore County, and Martenet's 1865 map of Maryland.

See also

Bellow's Spring Methodist Church
Long Reach, Columbia, Maryland

References

Unincorporated communities in Howard County, Maryland
Unincorporated communities in Maryland
African-American history of Howard County, Maryland